Calella de Palafrugell is one of three coastal towns belonging to the municipality of Palafrugell in the province of Girona, Spain. All three towns are part of the Costa Brava, the coastal region of northeastern Catalonia, in the comarca of Baix Empordà. It should not be confused with the larger, more commercialised resort of Calella, which is further south towards Barcelona, in the comarca of Maresme.

Calella de Palafrugell has an excellent setting and, whilst busy in the summer season, it does not have the large hotels and mass tourism of other Costa Brava resorts such as Lloret de Mar. The town has a number of good standard hotels, apartments and, at a distance from the beach, some campsites. Like much of the picturesque section of the Costa Brava, north of Palamos and south of L'Estartit, Calella has moved steadily upmarket in recent times and offers some very high quality restaurants and hotels - at prices to match. The beaches are Blue Flag standard. Calella de Palafrugell is a very popular destination dominated by apartments blocks set just back enough not to be seen from the beach.

The town's origin is that of a fishing village, and its old maritime quarter, the  has been declared a cultural asset of national importance. This quarter retains the original layout of the village, with its traditional white porched buildings. It includes the complex of vaults, originally used to sew nets and auction fish, but now occupied by restaurants. The vaults are fronted by the beaches of Platja del Port de Malaspina and Platja de Portbò, which formed a natural fishing port and are still home to a fleet of small fishing boats. Also in Port Bo is the Sa Perola Interpretation Centre, housed in a former net dyeing house and now used as a tourist office and interpretation centre for the fishing industry and maritime heritage of the district.

Calella de Palafrugell has a number of small coves and beaches linked via a well engineered coastal walk known as the Cami de Ronda, passing along the cliffs and through several tunnels on the way. From the north the first of the beaches is Platja del Canadell, with its beach restaurant. Platja del Port de Malaspina, Platja de Portbò and Platja d'en Calau are linked sandy coves located in the centre of Calella.

The castle has also been declared a cultural asset of national importance. The castle was built, and the gardens created, between 1929 and 1975, by Nicholas Woevodski and Dorothy Webster. The Cap Roig Festival, a music and dance festival, is held in the gardens between July and August.

The GR 92 long-distance footpath, which runs the length of the Mediterranean coast of Spain, passes along the Cami de Ronda. To the north of Platja del Canadell‎  the path follows the coast the short distance to Llafranc, passing the 16th century  on the way.

Gallery

References

Bibliography
Catalunya and the Costa Brava (Lonely Planet Travel Guides)  
Costa Brava (Rough Guide Directions) 

Bays of Catalonia
Populated places in Baix Empordà
Seaside resorts in Spain
Beaches of Catalonia